"Federal Republic of Ambazonia" or Ambazonia is the political notion of a attempted West African sovereign state, as claimed by separatist guerrillas who are in an armed conflict with the Cameroonian military, in what is known as the Anglophone Crisis. The armed group, which declared independence from Cameroon in 2017, does not control almost any of the territory it claims, comprising Northwest Region and Southwest Region of Cameroon. No country has recognized this claim as of 2023.

Until 1961, the territory of these regions was a British trust territory, Southern Cameroons, while the rest of Cameroon was a French trust territory, French Cameroon. At independence, a plebiscite was held, and voters in Southern Cameroons opted to join Cameroon as a constituent state of a federal republic. Over time, the power of the central government, dominated by Francophones, expanded at the expense of the region's autonomy. Many inhabitants identify as Anglophones and resent what they perceive as discrimination and efforts to eliminate Anglophone legal, administrative, educational, and cultural institutions by the Cameroonian government.

In 2016 and 2017, a widespread protest movement was met with a violent government crackdown, which led to rioting and violence against security forces and, in 2017, a unilateral declaration of independence by Ambazonian leaders. Ambazonian forces have struggled to form a united front, and internecine conflicts have hampered efforts to negotiate with Cameroon or establish control over the various militia groups engaged in the fighting. Ongoing violence has led to widely reported human rights abuses by both sides, including indiscriminate killing of civilians, torture, rape and gender-based crimes, and unjustified detentions and kidnappings.

Etymology and terminology 

The term "Ambazonia" is derived from the word Ambozes, the local name for the bay at the mouth of the Wouri river, known in English as Ambas Bay. The name was coined by Fon Gorji Dinka in 1984 as part of a campaign for the restoration of autonomy and preservation of Anglophone institutions in the region.

The term Ambazonia is more usually associated with the separatist or independence-seeking faction, while the Cameroonian government and other official sources, such as the UN, continue to refer to the "Northwest Region" and "Southwest Region" (or sometimes the "NoSo" regions), the official names of the two administrative provinces since 1972. Other sources may also refer to "Southern Cameroons", "Anglophone Cameroon" or "Cameroon's Anglophone regions".

Origins

Colonial contest in the region 
The area around the mouth of the Wouri River is where the English language was permanently established for the first time in Southern Cameroons, when missionary Alfred Saker founded a settlement of freed slaves by Ambas Bay in 1858, which was later renamed Victoria (present-day Limbe). In 1884, the area became the British Ambas Bay Protectorate, with Victoria as its capital. Britain ceded the area to the German territory of Kamerun in 1887. Germany had some trouble establishing control over the hinterlands of Victoria, and fought the Bafut Wars against local fondoms until 1907.

Following World War I and the Treaty of Versailles, Kamerun was divided between a French and a British League of Nations Mandate. The French mandate was known as Cameroun, and comprised most of the former German territory. The British mandate was an elongated strip of land along the border of Colonial Nigeria, consisting of Northern Cameroons and Southern Cameroons, including the historical Ambas Bay Protectorate. This territory was organized as British Cameroons.

The British administered the territories through indirect rule, allowing native authorities to administer the population according to their own traditions. In 1953, the Southern Cameroons delegation at a conference in London asked for a separate region. The British agreed, and Southern Cameroons became an autonomous region with its capital still at Buea. Elections were held in 1954 and the parliament met on 1 October 1954, with E. M. L. Endeley as Premier.

1961 referendum 

The United Nations organised a plebiscite in the region on 11 February 1961 which put two alternatives to the people: union with Nigeria or union with Cameroon. The third option, independence, was opposed by the British representative to the UN Trusteeship Council, Sir Andrew Cohen, and as a result was not listed. In the plebiscite, 60% of voters in the Northern Cameroons voted for union with Nigeria, while 70% of voters in the Southern Cameroons opted for union with Cameroon. The results owed partly to a fear of domination by much larger Nigeria. Endeley was defeated in elections on 1 February 1959 by John Ngu Foncha.

Southern Cameroons federated with Cameroon on 1 October 1961 as "West Cameroon", with its own prime minister. However, the English-speaking peoples of the Southern Cameroons did not believe that they were fairly treated by the 80% majority French-speaking government of the country. Then-president Ahmadou Ahidjo feared that Southern Cameroons would secede from the union, taking its natural resources with it. Following a French Cameroon unilateral referendum on 20 May 1972, a new constitution was adopted in Cameroon which replaced the federal state with a unitary state, and also gave more power to the president. Southern Cameroons lost its autonomous status and became the Northwest Region and the Southwest Region of the Republic of Cameroon. Pro-independence groups claimed that this violated the constitution, as the majority of deputies from West Cameroon had not consented to legitimize the constitutional changes. They argued that Southern Cameroons had effectively been annexed by Cameroon. Shortly afterwards, French Cameroun's political leadership changed the constitution again, appointed French-speaking Paul Biya as Prime Minister and successor to Ahmadou Ahidjo.

In a memorandum dated 20 March 1985, Anglophone lawyer and President of the Cameroon Bar Association Fongum Gorji Dinka wrote that the Cameroonian government led by Paul Biya was unconstitutional and announced the former Southern Cameroons should become independent as the Republic of Ambazonia. Dinka was incarcerated the following January without trial. Three years later, he escaped to Nigeria.

Southern Cameroons National Council 

In 1993, representatives of Anglophone groups convened the first All Anglophone Conference (AAC1) in Buea. The conference issued the "Buea Declaration", which called for constitutional amendments to restore the 1961 federation. This was followed by the second All Anglophone Conference (AAC2) in Bamenda in 1994. This conference issued the "Bamenda Declaration", which stated that if the federal state was not restored within a reasonable time, Southern Cameroons would declare its independence. The AAC was renamed the Southern Cameroons Peoples Conference (SCPC), and later the Southern Cameroons Peoples Organisation (SCAPO), with the Southern Cameroons National Council (SCNC) as the executive governing body. Younger activists formed the Southern Cameroons Youth League (SCYL) in Buea on 28 May 1995. The SCNC sent a delegation, led by John Foncha, to the United Nations, which was received on 1 June 1995 and presented a petition against the 'annexation' of the Southern Cameroons by French Cameroon. This was followed by a signature referendum the same year, which the organisers claim produced a 99% vote in favour of independence with 315,000 people voting.

SCNC activities were routinely disrupted by police. On 23 March 1997, about ten people were killed in a raid on a gendarme camp in Bamenda. The police arrested between 200 and 300 people, mostly SCNC supporters, but also members of the Social Democratic Front, an opposition party with significant support in the Anglophone regions. In the subsequent trials, Amnesty International and the SCNC found substantive evidence of admissions through torture and force. The raid and trial resulted in a shutdown of SCNC activities. In response to this, in April 1998 a small faction elected Esoka Ndoki Mukete, a high-ranking member of the Social Democratic Front, as the new chair of the SCNC. In October 1999, when many of the accused were found guilty in the 1997 trial, the faction led by Mukete became more assertive. On 1 October 1999, militants took over Radio Buea to proclaim the independence of Southern Cameroons, but failed to do so before security forces intervened. The leadership and many members of the SCNC were subsequently arrested. After clashes with the police, the SCNC was officially declared illegal by the Cameroonian authorities in 2001. In 2006, a faction of SCNC once again declared the independence of Ambazonia.

Recent usage

Protests and civil war in Cameroon 

In November 2016, a number of large protests and strikes were organized, initially by Anglophone lawyers, students, and teachers focused on the growing marginalization of English and Anglophone institutions in the law and education. Several demonstrations were violently dispersed by security forces, leading to clashes between demonstrators and police in which several people were killed. Violence by both sides undermined negotiations in early 2017, which fell apart without an agreement. The violence led to additional demonstrations, general strikes (called "lockdowns"), and further crackdowns by the government into early 2017, including the banning of civil society organizations, cutting off phone and internet connections from January to April, and arrests of demonstrators. Although the government established a Commission to focus on Anglophone grievances and took steps to address issues of language equity in courts and schools, continued distrust and harsh responses to protests prevented significant deescalation.

By late 2017, with dialogue efforts moribund and violence continuing on both sides, the leading Ambazonian nationalist movements organized the umbrella organization Southern Cameroons Ambazonia Consortium United Front (SCACUF). SCACUF unilaterally declared the region's independence as Ambazonia on October 1, the anniversary of Southern Cameroons' independence from the United Kingdom. SCACUF sought to transition itself into an interim government with its leader, Sisiku Ayuk Tabe Julius, as interim president. At least 17 people were killed in protests following the declaration of independence, while fourteen Cameroonian troops were killed in attacks claimed by the Ambazonia Defence Forces. The Cameroonian government stated that the declaration had no legal weight and on November 30, 2017, the President of Cameroon signaled a harder line on separatist attacks on police and soldiers. A massive military deployment accompanied by curfews and forced evacuations of entire villages. This temporarily ended hopes for continued dialogue and kicked of full-fledged guerilla war in Southern Cameroons. Several different armed factions have emerged such as the Red Dragons, Tigers, ARA, Seven Kata, ABL, with varying levels of coordination with and loyalty to Ambazonian political leaders. In practice, pro-independence militias operate largely autonomously from political leaders, who are mostly in exile.

On 5 January 2018, members of the Ambazonia Interim Government in exile in Abuja, Nigeria, including President Sisiku Julius Ayuk Tabe, were arrested and deported to Cameroon into the custody of government forces to face criminal charges. On 4 February 2018, it was announced that US-based preacher Dr. Samuel Ikome Sako would become the Interim President of the Federal Republic of Ambazonia, temporarily succeeding Ayuk Tabe. However, despite receiving a life sentence on terrorism charges from a Cameroon court, on 2 May 2019, Ayuk Tabe declared from prison the dissolution of Sako's caretaker cabinet and the restoration of his own cabinet. Sako resisted, leading to the 2019 Ambazonian leadership crisis.

As the violence intensified, international efforts to resolve the crisis picked up. On 13 May 2019, the United Nations Security Council had an informal meeting to discuss the Anglophone Crisis. Peace talks mediated by the Swiss government have fallen apart multiple times, primarily due to factional divisions and lack of actual control over militias by separatist leaders making even preliminary steps difficult.

The war has been characterized by guerilla attacks by separatist militias against both security forces and against civilians suspected of collaboration or simply failing to abide militia's declared school and election boycotts or "lockdowns" which prevent all travel and activity. Many militias have sought to enforce a total school strike since 2017 due to concerns over the lack of Anglophone teachers and curriculum. Teachers and students have been kidnapped and killed and many schools and school materials burned while many children have had no schooling since the crisis began. Others have alleged that some militias have engaged in ransom attacks against civilians to fund their continued activities. Meanwhile, government forces have torched entire villages suspected of harboring separatists, disappeared and executed civilians without due process, and tortured detainees. Reports of indiscriminate killings, torture, rape and other gender-based violence by both sides have been widely reported. The governments of the United States and Germany have expressed concern over the human rights violations and scaled back or cancelled military cooperation with Cameroon over reported abuses. France, the UK as well as the European Parliament have also expressed concern and pushed for negotiations between the parties to resolve the crisis.

Within the separatist organization 
The separatists assert that Ambazonia is legally governed by the "Interim Government of Ambazonia", as a provisional government in exile.

Ayuk Tabe cabinet (2017–18 )
The Interim Government of Ambazonia was formed from the Southern Cameroons Ambazonia Consortium United Front (SCACUF), a nonviolent independence movement. Its members includes former leaders of the Southern Cameroons National Council (SCNC), an independence movement that was prominent in the 1990s. It was SCACUF, led by Chairperson Sisiku Julius Ayuk Tabe, that declared the independence of Ambazonia on October 1, 2017. The Interim Government was officially formed on October 31, 2017, with Tabe assuming the role as President of Ambazonia and SCACUF forming the Interim Government.

By the time SCACUF transformed into the Interim Government, a separatist war had been raging for almost two months. Several separatist militias were active, with the largest one – the Ambazonia Defence Forces (ADF) – answering to the Ambazonia Governing Council (AGovC), led by Ayaba Cho Lucas and with Benedict Kuah as Chief of staff. The Interim Government initially rejected the idea of an armed struggle, preferring civil disobedience and a diplomatic campaign. In early November, the Interim Government condemned an ADF attack on gendarmes.

In January 2018, most members of the Interim Government were arrested by Nigerian authorities and extradited to Cameroon. They were subsequently imprisoned for almost a year, before a trial started in December 2018. This became controversial in Nigeria, as most of those deported had submitted claims for political asylum. In March 2019, a Nigerian court determined that the arrest and deportation had been unconstitutional, and ordered everyone returned to Nigeria and compensated. This had no practical implications, and on August 20, 2019, the ten leaders, including Ayuk Tabe, were sentenced to life imprisonment by the Yaoundé Military Tribunal.

Sako cabinet (2018–19)
Following the arrest of most of the Interim Government, Samuel Ikome Sako was elected in a diaspora electoral college to acting president in February 2018. In an attempt to unite several local militias under a single banner, the Interim Government created the Ambazonia Self-Defence Council (ASC) in March 2018. While the ASC is collectively larger than the ADF, it does not have a centralized command structure and is more of a cooperation project than a single organization.

President Sako sought to bury the differences between the Interim Government and the Ambazonia Defence Forces, which is loyal to the AGovC. On December 31, 2018, he announced that a Mobile Wing Police would be established, and that the separatists would abandon their defensive strategy and seize the offensive. He also promised to take action against anyone involved in the kidnapping of civilians, which had become a growing problem in Southern Cameroons. On March 31, 2019, the Interim Government and several Ambazonian movements agreed to create the Southern Cameroons Liberation Council, a united front consisting of both separatists and federalists. However, despite its attempts at uniting the separatists, critics accused the Sako cabinet of incompetence and misappropriation of funds.

Leadership crisis (2019–present)

On May 2, 2019, a document signed by Ayuk Tabe declared that the Sako-led interim cabinet had been dissolved, and that his own pre-arrest cabinet had been restored. The document expressed recognition for the job the Sako-led cabinet had done, but claimed that infighting had rendered it unfit to continue; the caretaker cabinet has lost the ability to reconcile our people and, in doing so, has imperiled the identity and mission of the interim government to complete the decolonization of Southern Cameroons through advancing our collective national interests. This triggered a leadership crisis within the Interim Government, as the Sako-led cabinet refused to step down. In June, the Ambazonia Restoration Council impeached Ayuk Tabe for "treasonous misconduct", and declared that a proper change of leadership would be initiated in three months. This marked the start of the 2019 Ambazonian leadership crisis. The AGovC threw its support behind Ayuk Tabe and in August it formally allied itself with the Ayuk Tabe-led faction of the IG.

Despite the imprisonment and the infighting within the Interim Government, Ayuk Tabe was still considered more influential than Sako. In July 2020, Cameroonian officials met with Ayuk Tabe and other members of his cabinet to discuss a ceasefire. When asked about his conditions for a ceasefire, Ayuk Tabe listed three; that the ceasefire be announced by President Paul Biya, that the Cameroonian military would pull out of the Anglophone regions, and a general amnesty for separatists.

The outbreak of the Insurgency in Southeastern Nigeria widened the gap between Ambazonian factions. The AGovC declared an alliance with the Indigenous People of Biafra (IPOB), a Biafran separatist movement. The Interim Government under Sako denounced this move, preferring instead to attempt to win the goodwill of the Nigerian government.

On 13 September 2022, long-term IG spokesperson Chris Anu (brother of deceased separatist general Lekeaka Oliver) declared himself President of Ambazonia.

On January 21, the government of Canada announced that the warring parties had signed an agreement to enter a peace process facilitated by Canada. The agreement was signed by the Cameroonian government, the Ambazonia Governing Council (and its armed wing, the ADF), the African People's Liberation Movement (and its armed wing, SOCADEF), the Interim Government of Ambazonia, and the Ambazonia Coalition Team.

Citations

References

Further reading

External links 

US plays unwilling host to Cameroon's rebel fundraisers, Africa Intelligence, February 22, 2023 (requires free registration)

 
Former British protectorates
Politics of Cameroon
Independence movements
Separatism in Cameroon
Territorial disputes of Cameroon
Members of the Unrepresented Nations and Peoples Organization